Lesotho competed in the 1978 Commonwealth Games in Edmonton, Alberta, Canada from August 3 to August 12, 1978. Their team consisted of eight athletes competing in track events.

Men

Athletics

Men

Track & road events

References

Nations at the 1978 Commonwealth Games
Lesotho at the Commonwealth Games
1978 in Lesotho